Mucilaginibacter ginsenosidivorax is a bacterium from the genus of Mucilaginibacter which has been isolated from sediments from the river Gapcheon in Korea. Mucilaginibacter ginsenosidivorax has the ability to convert ginsenoside.

References

Sphingobacteriia
Bacteria described in 2013